Shivagange is a mountain peak with a height of  and Hindu pilgrimage center located near Dobbaspet, in Bengaluru Rural district India.

 The sacred mountain is shaped as a shivalinga and a spring flows near locally called "Ganga", thereby giving the place its name. It is also known as Dakshina Kashi (Kashi of the South) and has various temples such as Gangadhareshwara temple, Sri Honnammadevi Temple, Olakal Teertha, Nandi Statue, Patalagang Sharadambe temple and several theerthas such as Agasthya theertha, Kanva theertha, Kapila theertha, Pathala Gange

Sri Honnammadevi Temple is inside the cave. Sri Gavi Gangadhare Temple is also inside the cave. Gavi means Cave, Gangadhareshwara means Parameshwara having Gange on the top. Every January, on the day of Sankranthi festival, the marriage function of Sri Gangadhareshwara and Sri Honnammadevi (Parvathi) is conducted. At that time it is claimed Ganga holy water comes from the rock at the top of hill and that holy water is used to solemnise the dhare ritual of the marriage function.

History 
The  number  of  steps  leading  to  the  top  is  said  to  equal  the  number  of yojanas    to  Benares. Hence this is   called  Dakshina Kasi. An  ascent  to  the  top is considered  as  a  pilgrimage to  the  holy  city.  

The  puranas  give  it  the  name  of  Kakudgiri.

During the reign of  Hoysala kings, the queen Shanthala, wife of Vishnuvardhana, who committed suicide from this hill as she did not give birth to a son.

The hill was fortified during the 16th century by Shivappa Nayaka. These fortifications currently lie in ruins. The founder of Bengaluru, Magadi Kempegowda, also made improvements to the fortifications and kept a portion of his treasure within it.

A month-long cattle fair is held during Sankranthi month (around January) every year, which is a market place for bullocks.

Beliefs surrounding the Gavi Gangadhareshwara Temple in Bengaluru
Followers believe an interesting miracle happens when abhisheka is performed on Shivalinga with ghee, the ghee turning to butter. It is claimed by the devotees/believers that this ghee has medicinal powers and can cure many ailments.

River Kumudvathi 
River Kumudvathi has its origin in the Shivagange hills and it is a tributary of river Arkavati. The Kumudvathi river flows across 278 villages covering  encompassing major part of Nelamangala Taluk, Bengaluru Rural District and parts of Magadi Taluk, Ramanagra district. Due to various factors like deforestation, unsustainable extraction of ground water, soil erosion, encroachments and eucalyptus plantations the river has dwindled in size. This has  resulting in serious water crisis for drinking and agriculture in all the villages under the river basin. However, projects and efforts are underway to revive the river.

Trekking
The area is a popular site for rock climbing in the Karnataka state. The entire trail to the peak is well marked and the presence of man-made steps (often carved into the rocky landscape, but sometimes made from rocks) makes the trail suitable for beginners. There are frequent rest opportunities with stalls serving food and drinks. The trail becomes steep and narrow near the summit of the mountain - safety rails are provided in such areas. Monkeys are the main fauna inhabiting the hill.

Protected monument
The temple shrine is a protected monument under the Karnataka Ancient and Historical Monuments and archaeological sites and remains act 1962.

References

External links

Mountains of Karnataka
Tourism in Karnataka
Hindu pilgrimage sites in India
Hindu temples in Tumkur district
Geography of Tumkur district